The Automobile License Plate Collectors Association (ALPCA) is the largest such organization in the world. Founded in Rumney Depot, New Hampshire, United States, in 1954 and holding its first meeting/convention in North Attleboro, Massachusetts, in 1955. It serves as a way for license plate collectors to trade plates, distribute news, and provide historic information to members.

Overview

ALPCA currently has approximately 2,800 registered members and over 13,100 registered member numbers, although many of the earlier—and therefore lower-numbered—members are now deceased or are no longer members. When an individual joins, he or she is assigned a membership number, which started with #1 in 1954, and are currently being issued in the 13,800 range.  Members treasure their "ALPCA number" and often are known as much by the time period in which they joined than by name or geographic home. The club hosts an annual convention each June or July that attracts several hundred members, and regional meets take place in a number of states, provinces, and  countries throughout the year. Due to the COVID-19 pandemic the 2020 convention, originally scheduled for Tulsa, Oklahoma from July 8–11, 2020, was cancelled. The next convention, open to members only, was scheduled for Covington, Kentucky, from August 4 to 7, 2021.

Members come from all 50 U.S. states and the District of Columbia, as well as nineteen countries.  Most members reside in the United States, followed by Canada, Germany, and Australia.  Members receive the bi-monthly full-color publication "Plates;" have full access to the organization's web-based license plate archives for every country around the world; access to back issues of all publications; and can attend both regional meets and the annual convention.

Despite the club's name, many members also collect and exchange license plates from vehicles other than automobiles.  Antique vehicle, bus, camper, farm, military, motorcycle, trailer, and truck plates are just a few of the hundreds of other plate types that have been issued and are now collected by members.

Since 1972 ALPCA has annually presented a "Best Plate Award" to an American state or Canadian province.  To better educate the public regarding genuine license plates the association provides a "Guide to Deceptive and Misleading Plates" for free on its website.

Many ALPCA members maintain their own interests and websites, sometimes overlapping, and sometimes going way beyond the confines of license plate collectors.  A subset of them are "Extra-Miler Club" members, who seek to visit every county in the United States, often while picking antique shops and other venue for old tags.  One member keeps track of the "highest numbers" issued in each state, and his website records what combinations are the latest to be issued.

ALPCA members often consult the media for stories on issues in automobilia.

Membership
The ALPCA has approximately 2,800 current members.  Members choose whether their membership lasts one, two, three, four, or five years.  Junior memberships, for those members less than 18 years of age, are also available.  The organization's magazine, "Plates," is mailed to all members, and all members in good standing are entitled to vote for officers and the Best Plate Award.  Members can research plates with the association's online archives which have been extensively expanded and updated in recent years.  Members may also display the ALPCA logo (shield) for personal use.

Executive Board
The ALPCA is run by a seven member Executive Board composed of the President, Vice-President, and five Directors.  All members serve two year terms. The President and three of the Directors terms expire in even numbered years, and the Vice-President and two Directors terms expire in odd numbered years.  The Administrative Staff, composed of the Secretary, Treasurer, Plates Editor, Webmaster, Regional Meet Coordinator, Complaint Chairman, and Legal Counsel, are appointed by the Executive Board,  Similarly, the Project Staff, consisting of the Convention Planner, Convention Administrator, Archivist, Hall of Fame Coordinator, and Best Plate Coordinator, are also appointed by the Executive Board.  The President also serves as the Chairman of the Executive Board.  Note that prior to the 1977 election of board members there were multiple other elected offices which are not shown here.

List of ALPCA Presidents
The ALPCA presidents' term of office has changed two times.  From 1955 until 1961 their term was two years, from 1961 until 2004 the term was one year, and since 2004 the term is once again two years.  To simplify the following chart multiple terms served consecutively are combined in one row. 
The following list of ALPCA Presidents was compiled from the ALPCA Newsletter, ALPCA Register, and Plates Magazine.

Events

International conventions
The ALPCA has held annual conventions since 1955.  The four earliest conventions were held at  the host members' home.  Since 1959 the annual conventions have been held in a larger private or public venue, and those held since 1984 have been at a convention center or other similarly large public venue.  Conventions include three days of selling and trading of plates on the convention floor, an auction of license plates donated by members and individual states' department of motor vehicles, member displays that are judged and presented awards in many categories, committee and membership meetings, and social activities.  Newly elected Executive Board members are installed just prior to the convention start.  Conventions are only open to members and their guests.

Regional meets
Regional meets provide the opportunity for members to sell, trade, or barter plates with other members between annual conventions.  The dates for officially sanctioned meets are published in the organization's magazine "Plates."  These meets often include auctions, regional meetings, awards, and a social event such as a lunch meal.  Like the annual conventions, regional meets are only open to members and invited guests.  The number of regional meets varies each year, but recent years have seen 15 – 25 regional meetings.  Some regional groups hold a single meeting, while others may host quarterly meetings.  A list of upcoming regional meetings is also maintained at the ALPCA website.

Independent meets

Although these meets are not sponsored by ALPCA they provide some of the same collecting opportunities that the ALPCA annual convention and officially sanctioned regional meets provide.  The independent meets also allow the general public a way to meet ALPCA members, help members learn about plates by talking to sellers, and begin or add to their collections of license plates.  A list of upcoming independent meetings is maintained at the ALPCA website.

Publications
From its inception ALPCA has distributed a publication to all active members.  Unofficially, the primary publication was titled the ALPCA Newsletter, but it was many years before this was formalized.  The name first appeared on the masthead in April 1972, but the name had appeared in the newsletter itself many times before this date.  The ALPCA Newsletter changed names in February 2000 to the ALPCA Register, and since December 2004 has been known as Plates Magazine or informally as Plates.  Back issues of these publications are available to active members on the association's website.

Plates Magazine
Plates Magazine is full color and regularly features articles relating the history of a topic, such as an individual state, province, or country's plates; provides information about newly issued plate; convention, regional, and independent meet details; photo histories of plates and related ephemera, such as validation stickers or tabs;  topical histories such as motorcycle, special event, ham radio, personalized plates; articles on individual collectors or collections; annual base plate information for North American jurisdictions; etc.

Archives
The online archives provide members an extensive research tool for information regarding the year a license plate was issued, serial numbers issued, colors, dates issued, slogans, plate material, and other plate characteristics.  Originally relatively static, the archives have been greatly expanded, become an online database that is much easier to search, sort, and provides much improved photos over the original archives.

Book
For the 50th anniversary of ALPCA two members wrote a book detailing the associations history.  This publication, "A Moving History, 50 Years Of ALPCA, 100 Years of License Plates" was written by Jeff Minard & Tim Stentiford, and published by Turner Communications.  In addition to the ALPCA history the book details 100 years of license plate history, and over 275 profiles of a cross section of ALPCA members.

Best Plate Award
Since 1972 members have voted each year to name one United States or Canadian license plate design, and in some years two such designs, introduced during the previous year as the "Best Plate."  The first award went to Pennsylvania for their early Bicentennial plate which featured the Liberty Bell in the center. The award to the 1970 Northwest Territories for their polar bear-shaped license plate was made by Executive Board action between December 1973 and February 1974.

Members votes are based on both the plate's legibility and its aesthetics.  For 1995, 1997, and 1998, the club recognized one standard-issue plate and one optional-issue plate, while in 1985 and 1989, two jurisdictions' designs tied for first place. The presentation of the award each year is usually covered by media outlets in the state that wins the award.

Hall of Fame
The ALPCA Hall of Fame was approved by the Board of Directors in 2002, but it did not officially induct any members until 2004.  "The goal of the Hall of Fame is [to] provide a vehicle to learn about our founding fathers and the legacy of leaders throughout the years who have embodied the fraternal spirit of our hobby."

"To be considered for the Hall of Fame, candidates must have served the club or hobby unselfishly for the good of all without concern for praise, compensation, or reward; promoted membership; provided guidance to fellow members; and taught others the value of collecting." 
Any member in good standing may nominate any ALPCA member for induction into the hall that they feel is deserving of the honor.  The Hall of Fame Committee reviewes all initial nominations, and the past presidents of the association vote to determine who on the list would be inducted in the Hall of Fame.

Notable members
 Robert M. "Bob" Crisler, of Lafayette, Louisiana, served as an officer of ALPCA and was inducted as one of the first members of its Hall of Fame.  He is a retired geography professor from the University of Louisiana, and authored "License Plate Values," the first collector price guide in the hobby.
 Jim Fox, drummer of the James Gang; served as an officer of the ALPCA and authored one of the most prominent published works within the hobby, License Plates of the United States.
 Ernest R. Hemmings, of Quincy, Illinois, the founder of Hemmings Motor News.
 Keith Marvin, of Menands, New York, wrote three books about license plates and seven books total. He wrote over 3,000 articles on automotive history, and his work appeared in more than 70 different publications.
 Doug DeMuro, a YouTuber, automotive journalist, and businessmen whose collection of low-numbered plates, including many political plates, serves as a backdrop for videos filmed in his garage.

References

External links
 
 https://www.nytimes.com/2004/10/27/automobiles/27MOOR.html

Collectors organizations
Vehicle registration plates
Motor clubs